William Louis Petersen (born February 21, 1953) is an American actor and producer. He is best known for his role as Gil Grissom in the CBS drama series CSI: Crime Scene Investigation (2000–2015), for which he won a Screen Actors Guild Award and was nominated for a Golden Globe Award; he was further nominated for three Primetime Emmy Awards as a producer of the show. He  reprised his role as Gil Grissom in the sequel CSI: Vegas, which premiered on October 6, 2021.

He also starred in the films To Live and Die in L.A. (1985), Manhunter (1986), Young Guns II (1990), Fear (1996), The Contender (2000), Detachment (2011), and Seeking a Friend for the End of the World (2012).

Early life
Petersen was born in Evanston, Illinois, the youngest of six children of June (née Hoene; 1909–2006) and Arthur Edward Petersen (1907 – 2004), who worked in the furniture business. Of Danish and German descent, he was raised in the Roman Catholic faith of his mother. He has two brothers, Arthur Jr. and Robert, and three sisters, Anne, Mary Kay, and Elizabeth.

He graduated from Bishop Kelly High School in Boise, Idaho, in 1972. He was accepted to Idaho State University on a football scholarship. While at Idaho State, Petersen took an acting course, which changed the direction of his life. He left school along with his wife, Joanne, in 1974, and followed a drama professor to the Basque country, where he studied as a Shakespearean actor. Petersen was interested in Basque culture: He studied the Basque language and gave his daughter the Basque name "Maite Nerea" ("My Beloved"); she was born in Arrasate/Mondragón in 1975. Petersen returned to Idaho with the intention of being an actor. Not wanting to work a nonacting job in Idaho, he returned to the Chicago area, living with relatives. He became active in the theater and earned his Actors' Equity card. He performed with the Steppenwolf Theatre Company, of which he has been an ensemble member since 2008, and was a co-founder of the Remains Theater Ensemble, which also included other prominent Chicago actors Gary Cole and Ted Levine.

Career
In 1985, Petersen received his first break when he played a Secret Service agent gone rogue to avenge his mentor in William Friedkin's 1985 action film To Live and Die in L.A. In 1986, he played FBI agent Will Graham in the first Hannibal Lecter film, Manhunter. Because his role was so emotionally exhausting, he did everything he could to rid himself of Graham after finishing principal photography. He shaved off his beard, cut his hair, and bleached it blond. He also claims to have done this because, while rehearsing for a play in Chicago, his dialogue was always coming out like Graham's; he dyed his hair so he could look in the mirror and see a different person.

He declined a part in Oliver Stone's Platoon, as it would have kept him in the Philippines, away from his family. Instead, he worked on the 1987 HBO made-for-TV movie Long Gone as a minor league baseball player and manager named Cecil "Stud" Cantrell. Petersen was offered the role of Henry Hill in the film Goodfellas, but turned it down. An exposé about the film in the May 2015 issue of Playboy claims that Petersen turned down the audition altogether. In a 1990 ABC three-part miniseries, The Kennedys of Massachusetts, Petersen played U.S. President John F. Kennedy's father, Ambassador Joseph P. Kennedy. The film won an Emmy and a Golden Globe from eight and two nominations, respectively. Also in 1990, Petersen portrayed the infamous Patrick Floyd "Pat" Garrett in Young Guns II.

In 1993, Petersen appeared in a CBS TV miniseries, Return to Lonesome Dove, as former Ranger Gideon Walker. He played Steven Walker, a father who stops at nothing to break up the relationship between his daughter and her vicious boyfriend in Fear (1996). Petersen played Governor Jack Hathaway, an unscrupulous candidate for vice president following the death of the incumbent, in The Contender in 2000.

He appeared uncredited in the noir thriller Mulholland Falls as a character who finds himself on the violent receiving end of a Los Angeles police squad's tactics. In 1999, he starred in Kiss the Sky as "Jeff." He appeared as part of an all-star cast in a remake of the 1997 film 12 Angry Men (as Juror #12, a.k.a. "the Snob").

From 2000 to 2009, he played Dr. Gil Grissom in the CBS crime drama CSI: Crime Scene Investigation. Petersen took a break from CSI in 2006 to appear in a five-week run of the Trinity Repertory Company production of Dublin Carol by Conor McPherson, in Providence, Rhode Island. Petersen renewed his contract with CBS to appear on CSI for the 2008–09 season, reportedly for $600,000 per episode. On July 15, 2008, the Associated Press reported that Petersen was leaving the show as a regular following Season 9's tenth episode in order to pursue more stage-acting opportunities, but that he might return for guest spots. He remained an executive producer of the show. He reprised his role of Gil Grissom in the eleventh-season episode "The Two Mrs. Grissoms" (aired February 3, 2011). He came back in 2015 as a guest in the series finale, "Immortality."

In February 2020, Petersen announced to return for a CSI sequel series along with Jorja Fox, before the series was picked up as CSI: Vegas.

Personal life 
In 1975, Petersen and his then wife Joanne Brady welcomed a daughter, Maite. In June 2003, Petersen married his longtime girlfriend Gina Cirone. On July 5, 2011, Petersen and Cirone welcomed twins, a daughter and son, via surrogate. 

Peterson is an avid Chicago Cubs fan. In 2004, he described to Playboy a near-death experience he had in the 1980s which gave him "assurance" that there is an afterlife.

In August 2021, Petersen was taken to the hospital via ambulance after feeling unwell on the set of CSI: Vegas. He was experiencing symptoms of exhaustion after 12 weeks of shooting, and released from the facility soon after.

Honors 
On February 3, 2009, Petersen received a star on the Hollywood Walk of Fame.

Filmography

Film

Television

Video games

Production credits 
CSI: Crime Scene Investigation
CSI: Vegas
Keep the Change as producer
Hard Promises as producer

Live theatre

Remains Theatre 
 Indulgences in a Louisville Harem (1980)
 Sixty Six Scenes of Halloween (1981)
 The Tooth of Crime (1984) as Hoss (nominated by Joseph Jefferson Awards)
 Balm in Gilead (1981–82) as Joe Conroy
 Moby Dick (1984) as Ahab
 A Class "C" Trial in Yokohama
 Big Time (1987) as Paul
 American Buffalo (1991) as Teach
 Once in Doubt (1992) as Painter
 The Chicago Conspiracy Trial (1992)
 Waiting for Godot
 The Time of Your Life as Joe
 Farmyard
 Traps
 Speed the Plow (1987) as Bobby Gould

Steppenwolf Theatre Company
Source: Steppenwolf

 Balm in Gilead (1981) as Joe Conroy
 Fool for Love (1984) as Eddie
 Dublin Carol (2008) as John Plunkett
 Endgame (2010) as Hamm
 Slowgirl (2013) as Sterling
 The Minutes (2017) as Mayor Superba

Goodman Theatre 
 Gardenia by John Guare (1983) as Unknown
 The Time of Your Life (1984) as Joe
 Glengarry Glen Ross (1984) as James Lingk
 The Night of the Iguana (1994) as Reverend Shannon

Victory Gardens Theater (Chicago, Illinois) 
 Dillinger (1978) as John Dillinger
 Heat (February 1978)
 Towards the Morning (October 1978)
 Flyovers (1998) as Ted
 Blackbird (2009) as Ray (won the Jeff Awards)

Wisdom Bridge Theatre (Chicago) 
 Canticle of the Sun (1981) as Unknown
 In the Belly of the Beast (1985) as Jack Henry Abbott (Prize Joseph Jefferson Awards Best Actor)
 Speed the Plow (1989) as Bobby Gould

Other stage works 
 Darkness at Noon (1976), Chicago area production
 A Streetcar Named Desire (1984) as Stanley Kowalski, Stratford Festival of Canada, Stratford, Ontario, Canada, 1984
 Days and Nights Within, by Ellen McLaughlin (1986) as Interrogator, Remains Theatre production at Organic Theatre, Chicago
 Puntila and His Hired Mano (1986) as Matti, Organic Theatre
 Speed the Plow as Bobby Gould, Kennedy Center in Washington, D.C.
 The Night of the Iguana (1996) as Reverend T. Lawrence Shannon, Roundabout Theatre Company, Criterion Center Stage Right Theatre, New York City
 Twelfth Night as Unknown, Illinois Shakespeare Festival
 As You Like It as Unknown, Illinois Shakespeare Festival
 In Belly of the Beast (1983) as Jack Henry Abbott (Ivanhoe Theatre, Chicago, IL, 1985 and John F. Kennedy Center for the Performing Arts, Washington, D.C., 1985) (nominated for Helen Hayes Awards Non-Resident Acting, 1986)
 A Class C Trial in Yokohama, Chicago Theatre Project
 In The Belly of the Beast: Letters from Prison, Glasgow, Scotland and London, England, including the American Festival, London, 1985
 A Dublin Carol by Conor McPherson (2006) as John Plunkett, Trinity Reportory Company (Providence)
 Slowgirl by Greg Pierce (2014) (Los Angeles, California, Geffen Playhouse)
 Appeared in productions at Boise State University and Lewis and Clark College

Stage director 
 Farmyard, Remains Theatre, Chicago, c. 1980
 Traps, Remains Theatre, 1983

Accolades

See also 

 List of stars on the Hollywood Walk of Fame

References

External links 

 
 Screen grabs, press stills and information about Petersen's famous role in Michael Mann's Manhunter (1986)
 "Petersen not sad about 'CSI' exit", Digital Spy, January 9, 2009
 William Petersen Biography (1953-) at Film Reference
 The William Petersen Appreciation Page

1953 births
20th-century American male actors
21st-century American male actors
American male film actors
American male stage actors
American male television actors
American people of Danish descent
American people of German descent
Television producers from Illinois
Idaho State Bengals football players
Idaho State University alumni
Living people
Male actors from Evanston, Illinois
Male actors from Idaho
People from Boise, Idaho
Steppenwolf Theatre Company players